Abu Ja'far Muhammad ibn Uthman was the second of the Four Deputies, who are believed by the Twelvers to have successively represented their twelfth Imam, Muhammad al-Mahdi, during his Minor Occultation (874–941 CE). Abu Ja'far in this role succeeded his father, Uthman ibn Sa'id al-Asadi, the first deputy. After some forty years in office, Abu Ja'far died in 304 or 305 AH (917 or 918 CE) and was succeeded by Ibn Ruh al-Nawbakhti, the third deputy. Abu Ja'far has been credited with the unification of the mainstream Shia.

Historical background 
Until their deaths, the tenth and eleventh Shia Imams (Ali al-Hadi and Hasan al-Askari, respectively) were held in the garrison town of Samarra under close surveillance (or house arrest) by the Abbasids, who are often responsible in Shia sources for poisoning the two Imams. The two Imams witnessed the deterioration of the Abbasid caliphate, as the imperial authority rapidly transitioned into the hands of the Turks, particularly after al-Mutawakkil.

Contemporary to the tenth Imam, the Abbasid al-Mutawakkil violently prosecuted the Shia, partly due to a renewed Zaydi opposition. The restrictive policies of al-Mutawakkil towards the tenth Imam were later adopted by his son, al-Mu'tamid, who is reported to have kept the eleventh Imam under house arrest without any visitors. Instead, al-Askari is known to have primarily communicated with his followers through a network of representatives. Among them was Uthman ibn Sa'id, who is said to have disguised himself as a seller of cooking fat to avoid the Abbasid agents, hence his nickname al-Samman. Tabatabai suggests that these restrictions were placed on al-Askari because the caliphate had come to know about traditions among the Shia elite, predicting that the eleventh Imam would father the eschatological Mahdi.

Immediately after the death of al-Askari in 260 (874), Uthman ibn Sa'id claimed that the eleventh Imam had a young son, named Muhammad, who had entered a state of occultation due to the Abbasid threat to his life. As the special agent of al-Askari, Uthman also claimed that he had been appointed to represent the son of the eleventh Imam. Twelver sources detail that Muhammad al-Mahdi made his only public appearance to lead the funeral prayer for his father instead of his uncle, Ja'far. 

Thus began a period of about seventy years, later termed the Minor Occultation (260-329 AH, 874–940 CE), during which it is believed that four successive agents represented the Hidden Imam, collectively known as the Four Deputies. An agent was variously called deputy, emissary, and gate.

Tenure as an agent of al-Mahdi 
Abu Ja'far succeeded his father, Uthman ibn Sa'id, in this role. As with his father, Abu Ja'far was earlier a representative of al-Askari. Tusi in his Rijal reports that the eleventh Imam had appointed Abu Ja'far and his father as agents of his son, Muhammad, in the presence of a group of Yemeni followers. Shortly after the death of his father, Abu Ja'far is said to have received a letter of condolence from the Hidden Imam. Abu Ja'far, who served for some forty years in this office, has been credited with the unification of the mainstream Shia behind the son of al-Askari as the twelfth Imam in concealment. In this task, Abu Ja'far was assisted by Abu Sahl al-Nawbakhti, a renowned Twelver theologian of this period, whose ties with the Abbasid court helped spread the Twelver beliefs. Abu Ja'far died in 304 or 305 (917 or 918) and was succeeded by Ibn Ruh al-Nawbakhti.

Sometime after 279 (879), the office of deputyship relocated to Baghdad from Samarra, following the footsteps of the Abbasid court. Especially during the caliphates of al-Muqtadir and al-Radi, the Twelver leadership in Baghdad could also rely on the support and protection of some powerful Twelver families who were in the service of the Abbasids, such as the Ibn al-Furat and Banu Nawbakht families.

Works
Among other books about Islamic jurisprudence, Abu Ja'far wrote Kitab al-Ashriba. This book, according to his daughter, was handed down to the third agent, Ibn Ruh al-Nawbakhti, and then to the last agent, al-Samarri.

See also
Uthman ibn Sa'id al-Asadi
Abu al-Qasim al-Husayn ibn Ruh al-Nawbakhti
Abu al-Hasan Ali ibn Muhammad al-Samarri

References

Sources 
 
 
 
 
 
 
 
 
 
 
 
 
 
 

Iraqi Shia Muslims
Mahdism